Touché Amoré is an American post-hardcore band from Los Angeles, formed in 2007. The band consists of vocalist Jeremy Bolm, guitarists Clayton Stevens and Nick Steinhardt, bassist Tyler Kirby, and drummer Elliot Babin. Among other releases, they have released five studio albums: ...To the Beat of a Dead Horse in 2009,  Parting the Sea Between Brightness and Me in 2011, Is Survived By in 2013,  Stage Four in 2016, and Lament in 2020.

History

Formation and debut album (2007–2009)

The band released their debut 7-inch demo on No Sleep Records in September 2008. After a few west coast tours, the band went back into the studio to record their full length entitled ...To the Beat of a Dead Horse. The album was recorded at Earth Capital studios in January 2009. The LP was released in June 2009 on both 6131 and Geoff Rickly of Thursday's Collect Records, both of whom were in a partnership in the release. The album was released only on LP format and Digital. The album was met with generally positive reviews from critics including Sputnikmusic, Punknews.org, and Alternative Press. It also made its way onto multiple "Best Albums of 2009" lists.

Parting the Sea Between Brightness and Me (2010–2012)
Touché Amoré's second studio album, Parting the Sea Between Brightness and Me was released on June 7, 2011, through independent record label Deathwish Inc. The band worked with producer and engineer Ed Rose at his Black Lodge Recording Studio in Eudora, Kansas. Bolm considers the album lyrically to center around the deterioration of relationships and finding comfort in the distance from home while touring, also saying "it [the album] became relative to everything that was going on at that moment." The album received praise from multiple reviewers, as well as being placed Number 6 on Rock Sound's annual "Album of the Year" chart at the end of 2011. Immediate promotion for the album's release in Europe lead to being the main support band for La Dispute with Norwegian hardcore punk band Death Is Not Glamorous also supporting. The tour started July 27, 2011, and finishing August 12 and coincided with both La Dispute's and Touché Amoré's appearances at Hevy Festival in the United Kingdom, Fluff fest in Czech Republic and Ieperfest in Belgium.

Across late February and March 2012 Touché Amoré toured with Pianos Become the Teeth and Basement. The United Kingdom tour features Basement supporting Touché Amoré for half the tour while Pianos Become the Teeth supported the other half. In between the headlined February and March date, the band support Rise Against and Architects in a European tour.  In May 2012 Touché Amoré recorded and a released a live extended play called Live on BBC Radio 1. The EP contains four recorded tracks and features Jordan Dreyer of La Dispute as guest vocals on one of the tracks.

The band toured in support of Circa Survive in late 2012, and toured Europe and the UK with Converge in November/December 2012.

Is Survived By (2013–2015)

After returning home from their first tour of Japan with Loma Prieta, the band hit the studio to record a new album in Los Angeles, CA at the Seagrass Studio with producer Brad Wood (Sunny Day Real Estate, mewithoutYou, Smashing Pumpkins).

On June 27, 2013, the band unveiled their album title and the September 24, 2013, release date. Is Survived By was released on Deathwish Inc. The opening track of the album, "Just Exist," on premiered July 30.

The first tour on the new album was a direct support slot for AFI followed by a European headlining tour with Self Defense Family and Dad Punchers (now Warm Thoughts). While in Europe the band recorded a second BBC Live on Radio 1 session featuring three songs from Is Survived By and "Gravity, Metaphorically" from the Pianos Become the Teeth split 7-inch. The recording was released as Live on BBC Radio 1 Vol 2 on 7-inch September 2014 on Deathwish Inc.

In 2014 the band toured the US co-headlining with mewithoutYou, performed at SXSW 2014, returned to Europe with Birds in Row supporting, headlined a Summer US tour with Tigers Jaw and Dads in support, returned to Europe / UK to perform at Reading / Leeds festivals as well as Pukkelpop in Belgium. The band played Russia for the first time in August. In the Fall of 2014 the band did one final US tour in support of Is Survived By with Rise Against. They returned to Japan to tour with ENVY in October then finished out the year at The Fest in Gainesville, FL on Halloween Night.

In 2015 the band did limited touring but returned to Australia with Every Time I Die then toured Europe with Loma Prieta, Dangers, and Newmoon after performing at the 2015 Coachella Festival.

A collaborative split with Self Defense Family, Self Love, was released in 2015 and contains songs that the two bands wrote and recorded together with producer Will Yip.

Stage Four (2016–2018) 
Touché Amoré released their fourth studio album and Epitaph Records debut titled Stage Four on September 16, 2016. The title of the album takes on a double meaning, hinting at both the fact it's the band's fourth full-length album and also the highest level of cancer staging—a reference to the fact that Bolm's mother died of cancer in 2014. Coinciding with the album's announcement in June 2016, the band released the track "Palm Dreams" for online streaming. The track is about Bolm realizing he will never fully understand why his mom moved to California in the 1970s. He elaborated: "I assume that because she was from a small town, her eyes were wide with the concept of Hollywood. I'm sure someone else in my family could tell me, but it wouldn't be her answer. If this song inspires anyone to ask the questions they've never asked their loved ones, I'd call it a success."

After releasing Stage Four, the band spent the next several months touring and playing festivals to help promote their new album, which included shows with Balance and Composure and Hum, a U.S. Tour with Tiny Moving Parts and Culture Abuse, and festival performances at Sound on Sound Fest in Austin and The Wrecking Ball festival in Atlanta. On October 5, the band announced that they will be doing a U.K./European tour with Angel Du$t in early 2017. The band went on a US tour with Thursday and Basement in spring of 2017.

On April 19, 2018, the band released a new single titled "Green", via Epitaph Records.

Dead Horse X and Lament (2019–present) 
To celebrate the tenth anniversary of their debut album, ...To The Beat Of A Dead Horse, the band re-recorded the entirety of the record and released it on August 9, 2019, under the name of Dead Horse X.

On September 10, 2019, the band released a new single titled "Deflector", via Epitaph Records. It was produced by Ross Robinson. On February 17, 2020, the band returned to Robinson to record their upcoming fifth album.

In late July 2020 the band started mailing out flexi discs with a new song Limelight on it to fans, the song featured singer Andy Hull from the band Manchester Orchestra. On July 29 the band officially released the Limelight as a single, and announced their 5th studio album Lament to be released on October 9, 2020. The band released 3 subsequent singles for the album, Deflector on September 11, 2019, I'll Be Your Host on September 2, 2020, and Reminders on September 30, 2020. They also released two music videos, one for Limelight and another one for Reminders, the latter of two consisted of clips of friends of the band with their pets, and featured such people as Jason Aalon Butler, Skrillex, Frank Iero, Keith Buckley, and Andy Hull.

Lament has been described by Bolm as a companion piece to Stage Four, whilst being a departure from the topic of the earlier record. When asked about the record and its relation to Stage Four, Bolm said “I knew I didn’t want to write any more songs about that subject matter, because: a) I’ve done it already, b) I don’t really want to keep living in that headspace, and c) I need to move on from that, as a human. I could literally write five more albums about it, but that’s not good for me or anybody.” Lament was released to positive critical reviews, amassing a Metascore of 83.

Members

Current
 Jeremy Bolm – vocals (2007–present), occasional live guitar (2016–present)
 Clayton Stevens – lead guitar (2007–present)
 Nick Steinhardt – bass (2007–2010), rhythm guitar (2010–present)
 Elliot Babin – drums (2009–present)
 Tyler Kirby – bass (2010–present)

Former
 Jeremy Zsupnik – drums (2007–2009)
 Tyson White – rhythm guitar (2007–2010)

Timeline

Discography

Studio albums

Live albums
  10 Years / 1000 Shows: Live at the Regent Theater (2018)

Extended plays and splits 
Demo (2008, No Sleep)
Searching for a Pulse/The Worth of the World (split with La Dispute) (2010, No Sleep)
Touché Amoré / Make Do and Mend (split with Make Do and Mend) (2010, 6131/Panic)
Touché Amoré / The Casket Lottery (split with The Casket Lottery) (2012, No Sleep)
Touché Amoré / Pianos Become the Teeth (split with Pianos Become the Teeth) (2013, Deathwish/Topshelf)
Touché Amoré / Title Fight (split with Title Fight) (2013, Sea Legs)
Self Love (split with Self Defense Family) (2015, Deathwish)
 Covers Vol. 1 (2021)
 Touché Amoré / Circa Survive (2022, split with Circa Survive)

Live EPs 
 Live at WERS (2010, Condolences)
 Live on BBC Radio 1 (2012, Deathwish)
 Live on BBC Radio 1: Vol 2 (2014, Deathwish)
 Live on BBC Radio 1: Vol 3 (2017, Epitaph)

Singles 
 "Gravity, Metaphorically" (2013)
 "Condolences"/"Available Flexi" (2015)
 "Green" (2018)
 "Deflector" (2019)

Music videos
 "Home Away from Here" (2011)
 "Gravity, Metaphorically" (2013)
 "Harbor" (2013)
 "Palm Dreams" (2016)
 "Skyscraper" (2016)
 "Benediction" (2017)
 "Green" (2018)
 "Limelight" (2020)
 "Reminders" (2020)
 "Lament" (2020)

Compilation contributions
 "Available" (The National cover; compilation album A Comp for Mom)  (2014, No Sleep Records)
 "Lounge Act" (Nirvana cover; tribute album Whatever Nevermind) (2015, Robotic Empire)

References

External links
 

American post-hardcore musical groups
American screamo musical groups
Melodic hardcore musical groups from California
Emo musical groups from California
Emo revival groups
Hardcore punk groups from California
Punk rock groups from California
Musicians from Burbank, California
2007 establishments in California
Musical groups established in 2007
Epitaph Records artists
Deathwish Inc. artists
No Sleep Records artists